How to Be Indie is a Canadian television sitcom that aired on YTV from 2009 to 2011 and Disney Channel until 2012. The main character is a 13-year-old Indian-Canadian teenager named Indira "Indie" Mehta. The program is a single-camera series intended for a youth audience.

The series was created by Vera Santamaria, John May, and Suzanne Bolch. The series ran for two seasons with 52 episodes and aired its final episode on October 24, 2011 on YTV in Canada and May 26, 2012 on Disney Channel in the United Kingdom.

Plot
The program follows Indie's journey as she tries to get the most out of life despite the travails of junior high school and the expectations of her Indian parents. She is joined by her two best friends, Marlon Parks and Abigail "Abi" Flores.

She often falls into the trap of caring more about what her peers think of her than who she wants to be herself, and consequently spends a lot of time trying to impress her classmates. When not focusing on Indie, the show focuses on Marlon and Abi.

A given episode will usually show Marlon's quirky antics getting him into a troublesome situation. Abi will have to help extricate him, which she willingly does, feeling pity on him. Sometimes, however, they swap roles as Marlon tries to play it cool.

Production
The show is produced by Heroic Film Company in association with DHX Media and YTV and created by writer Vera Santamaria, Suzanne Bolch, and John May. Season one filmed 26 twenty-five-minute episodes and first premiered on 2 October 2009. The show was a part of YTV's "Big Fun Weeknights."

A second season began filming in summer 2010, shooting five episodes, and resumed filming in November 2010. The second season premiered on October 11, 2010. The series was not picked up for a third season.

Cast

Main

Melinda Shankar as Indira "Indie" Mehta, the main character of the show. An upbeat and lively teenager, she is a new generation of Indian and is very modern, which often clashes with her parents.
 Marline Yan as Abigail "Abi" Flores, Indie's best friend. Abi is very intelligent, always being there to get Indie and Marlon Parks out of trouble. Her parents have owned the Happy Breezy Food Hut since she was 5 years old.
 Dylan Everett as Marlon Parks, Indie's troublesome friend. He often relies on Abi to help him get out of trouble. He is raised by a single mother who is never shown onscreen.
 Sarena Parmar as Chandra Mehta, Indie's older sister. She enjoys being in the spotlight and outdoing her sister and brother, usually being rather selfish and selling her siblings out to get her way. Chandra is very familiar with her parents' traditional expectations and values, often finding ways around them with greater ease than Indie. She occasionally offers Indie sound advice.
 Varun Saranga as Arun Joshi "A.J." Mehta, Indie's older brother. He is the intelligent one in the family, but is known as a geek in school.
 Ellora Patnaik as Jyoti Mehta, Indie's mother. She is very traditional, usually favouring Chandra for being able to impress relatives.
 Vijay Mehta as Vikram Mehta, Indie's father. He often tries to boost his children's intelligence, and has an aversion to spending large amounts of money.
 Errol Sitahal as Prakash Mehta, Indie's paternal grandfather, known more familiarly as "Babaji".

Recurring
 Shainu Bala as Ram Ramachandran, a boy from India who lusts after Indie and loves proving his superiority.
 Nikki Shah as Ruby Patel, Indie, Chandra and A.J.'s cousin, the daughter of Jyoti's sister who is very self-absorbed and loves to torment Indie by showing that she's better than her at everything.
 Atticus Mitchell as Carlos Martinelli, a short-tempered student who loves to victimize other students who get in his way.
 Deborah Grover as Mrs. Roland, Indie's teacher who is very stern, but deep down has a good heart.
 Jordan Hudyma as Chad Tash (Season 1 and 2) Indie's love interest for the first season.
 Ted Ludzik as Coach Wexler, the P.E. teacher at the school, who has a very short temper.
 Alex De Jordy as Mike O'Donnell (Season 1) A.J.'s rival, whom he often competes for supremacy with.
 Georgina Reilly as Skye Rivers (Season 1) a gorgeous senior girl who Indie strives to impress.
 Jason Jia as John Lu (Season 1) a Chinese student who idolizes Marlon and will help him with any ideas he has.
 Cassius Crieghtney as Dre (Season 2) an employee of the Happy Breezy Food Hut.
 Timothy Lai as Aidan (Season 2) Indie's love interest after she loses interest in Chad.
 Max Topplin as Madison
 Will Bowes as Chuck

Episodes

Season 1 (2009–10)

Season 2 (2010–11)

References

External links
 
 Official YTV Website
 DHX Media Indie website
 Australia Broadcasting Corporation Indie website

2009 Canadian television series debuts
2011 Canadian television series endings
2000s Canadian teen sitcoms
2010s Canadian teen sitcoms
YTV (Canadian TV channel) original programming
Television series about families
Television series about teenagers
Television series by DHX Media
Television shows set in Toronto
Television shows filmed in Toronto
Canadian Screen Award-winning television shows